Brews Brothers was an American comedy streaming television series created by Greg Schaffer that was released on April 10, 2020 on Netflix.

Cast and characters

Main

 Alan Aisenberg as Wilhelm Rodman, the owner and brewmaster of Rodman's Brewing Company in Van Nuys, California
 Mike Castle as Adam Rodman, Wilhelm's pretentious brother
 Carmen Flood as Sarah, the underage manager at Rodman's Brewing Company who used to be MMA fighter and has a cauliflower ear due to an injury
 Marques Ray as Chuy, another employee at Rodman's Brewing Company who used to be an auto body mechanic

Recurring

 Zach Reino as Elvis, a co-owner of the "Kids Menu" food truck which is parked outside of Rodman's Brewery
 Inanna Sarkis as Becky, the other co-owner of the "Kids Menu" and Elvis's girlfriend
 James Earl as Matt, a member of Rodman's Brewery's Founders Circle
 Mike Mitchell as Jack, another of Rodman's Brewery's Founders Circle
 Flula Borg as Truffle, a monk from the monastery in Belgium who Wilhelm connected with

Episodes

Production

Development
On August 23, 2019, it was announced that Netflix had given the production a series order for a first season consisting of eight episodes. The series was created by Greg Schaffer who was also expected to executive produce alongside Jeff Schaffer, Jonathan Stern, and Keith Quinn. The series premiered on April 10, 2020.

Casting
Alongside the initial series announcement, it was reported that Alan Aisenberg, Mike Castle, Carmen Flood, and Marques Ray were cast as series regulars.

Reception
On Rotten Tomatoes, the series holds an approval rating of 40% based on 10 reviews, with an average rating of 4/10. The website's critics consensus reads, "Brews Brothers has its moments, but predictable plotting and uneven humor make the whole brew fall flat." On Metacritic, it has a weighted average score of 44 out of 100 based on 5 reviews, indicating "mixed or average reviews".

References

External links

2020 American television series debuts
2020s American comedy television series
English-language Netflix original programming
Television shows set in Los Angeles County, California
Works about beer